The locust digitate leafminer (Parectopa robiniella) is a moth of the family Gracillariidae. It is native to North America, but was accidentally introduced to Italy, where it was first found in 1970. It has now been recorded from Italy, France, Germany, Slovenia, Croatia, Austria, Serbia, Slovakia, Romania, Ukraine and Hungary.

The wingspan is about 5 mm. The moth flies in two to three generations per year in Hungary.

The larvae feed on Robinia species, including Robinia pseudoacacia. It mines the leaves of the host plant. The common name is derived from "digitate", referring to the "finger-like" excavations all around the margins of the central blotch of the mine.

External links
 Species info
 Fauna Europaea
 Bug Guide

Gracillariinae
Moths of Europe